is a metro station on the Toei Mita Line in Itabashi, Tokyo, Japan.

Lines
Toei Mita Line (I-22)

Platforms
The station consists of two elevated side platforms.

History
The station opened on 27 December 1968.

External links
 Shimura-sanchome Station information (Toei)

Railway stations in Japan opened in 1968
Railway stations in Tokyo
Toei Mita Line